Bishnupur  is a  junction station on the Kharagpur–Bankura–Adra line and Tarakeswar–Bishnupur branch line. It is located in Bankura district in the Indian state of West Bengal. It serves the temple town of Bishnupur and surrounding areas.

History
The Kharagpur–Midnapur branch line was opened in 1901. The Midnapore–Jharia extension of the Bengal Nagpur Railway, passing through Bankura district was opened around 1903–04.
Officially Bishnupur railway station started journey on 20th August, 1903. Maa Sharda while going to Calcutta boarded  train from here. Also there is a statue of her under the tree she used to seat.
The completion of the Bishnupur–Gokulnagar Joypur sector of the Sheoraphuli–Bishnupur branch line was announced in the Railway Budget for 2009–10. Part of the line is under construction.

Electrification
The Adra–Bheduasol sector was electrified in 1997–98, and the Bheduasol-Salboni sector in 1998–99.

References

External links
  Trains at Bishnupur

Railway stations in Bankura district
Adra railway division